Tell El Ghassil is an archaeological site located  north northeast of Rayak in the Beqaa Mohafazat (Governorate) of Lebanon. It dates at least to the Chalcolithic period.

References

Baalbek District
Chalcolithic sites of Europe
Archaeological sites in Lebanon
Great Rift Valley